Léon Fleuriot (5 April 1923 – 15 March 1987) was a French linguist and Celtic scholar, specializing in Celtic languages and the history of Gallo-Roman and Early Medieval Brittany.

Biography 
Born in Morlaix, Brittany, in a family originating in the region of Quintin and having studied Breton in his youth, Fleuriot passed his university history agrégation in 1950. He taught at lycées and collèges in Paris and the surrounding suburbs, as well as at the Prytanée National Militaire in La Flèche. He entered the Centre national de la recherche scientifique in 1958 and earned his doctorate at the Sorbonne University in 1964, defending a thesis called Le vieux-breton, éléments d'une grammaire (Old Breton, an Elementary Grammar), along with a complementary thesis, Dictionnaire des gloses en vieux-breton (Dictionary of Old Breton Glosses).

In 1966, Fleuriot was named chair of Celtic studies at the University of Rennes 2 – Upper Brittany in Rennes, and at the same time as research director at the École Pratique des Hautes Études in Paris.  He contributed greatly to the growth of Breton language teaching at the university level.

Fleuriot's book Les origines de la Bretagne defended a "two wave" model of British immigration into Brittany and argued that the legend of King Arthur arose from the life of Romano-British leader Ambrosius Aurelianus, who was known in Gaul as Riothamus. Fleuriot came into conflict with François Falc'hun's claim that Breton was essentially native Gaulish, only influenced by the incoming British language. However, he accepted that Breton had been influenced by surviving local forms of Celtic.

Fleuriot died suddenly in Paris in 1987, aged 63, leaving much of his planned research unfinished.

Works
A bibliography has been established by Gwennole ar Menn in Bretagne et pays celtiques, langues, histoire, civilisation (Skol, PUR, 1982), a collection of articles in honour of Léon Fleuriot.
 Le vieux breton: Éléments d'une grammaire. Paris: Klincksieck, 1964. 
 Dictionnaire des gloses en vieux breton. Paris: Klincksieck, 1964.
 A Dictionary of Old Breton - Dictionnaire du vieux breton: Historical and Comparative, in two parts. 2 vols. Toronto: Prepcorp, 1985. Part A reprints the '64 edn. while part B is a consensed, English-language version with some supplemental material.
Les origines de la Bretagne. Paris: Payot, 1980. 
Notes lexicographiques et philologiques (collection of articles published in the journal Études celtiques, collected by Gwennole ar Menn), Skol, 1997. 
 Articles in Annales de Bretagne, Bulletin de la Société archéologique du Finistère, Études celtiques, Hor Yezh.
Récits et poèmes celtiques. Paris: Stock, 1981. 
L'histoire littéraire et culturelle de la Bretagne. Vol. 1. Paris/Geneva, 1993.

References

1923 births
1987 deaths
People from Morlaix
Linguists from France
University of Paris alumni
Academic staff of the École pratique des hautes études
Academic staff of Rennes 2 University
Breton historians
French male non-fiction writers
Breton-speaking people
20th-century French historians
20th-century linguists
20th-century French male writers